Tarrys is an unincorporated community spanning both shores of the Kootenay River in the West Kootenay region of southeastern British Columbia.

Name origin & Tarry family
In 1896, James & Lydia Tarry, and children, settled on their Riverview Ranch. By 1901, their  orchard comprised 500 fruit trees, half apple and the rest cherry, plum, pear, and peach. James was a justice of the peace (JP) and president of the West Kootenay Farmers' Institute. Possibly on the stepping down of his father, Frank Tarry became a JP in 1914. On his death in 1917, James was the owner of the largest cleared ranch in the Kootenay Valley.

Railway
In 1906, Tarry Siding, also called Tarrys' Siding, Tarry's, and Tarry, opened on the Columbia and Kootenay Railway. Passenger service ended in the late 1950s.

Doukhobors
During 1910–1925, over 30 Doukhobor families settled.
1911: Uninsured Doukhobor sawmill at Tarry Siding burned to the ground. Rebuilding was immediate to complete the Canadian Pacific Railway tie contract.
1927: Storekeeper was convicted of perjury.
1932: Tarrys Doukhobor Society built a community hall.
1949: Freedomites burned down the new $85,000 Tarrys school.
1958: Children found a cache of blasting fuses and detonator caps at the Freedomite settlement.
1962: Freedomites dynamited West Kootenay Power and Light infrastructure.

Glade Ferry
From the 1910s, the Doukhobors operated the original ferry to serve their settlements on the south shore of the river stretching as far south as Tarrys. Being no schedule, users would yell for the reaction ferry if on the opposite bank. When the Brilliant Dam opened in 1944, the service ceased because of the reduced current. Subsequently, crossings depended upon a community-owned rowboat, and later a privately owned barge and tug. In 1955, the province installed a three-vehicle cable ferry, and moved the landing downstream to the population centre.
The vehicle capacity increased to five, and then eight in 1980.

The 10-vehicles/48-passenger ferry operates under private contract with the British Columbia Ministry of Transportation and is free of tolls, as are all inland ferries in BC.

Present community
Tarrys Fire Department, staffed by volunteers, owns a small fleet of fire trucks. Directly opposite is Kalesnikoff Lumber, the largest industry. However, this sawmill regards itself as being in Thrums, indicating the unclear boundary between the communities, or that Thrums is a generic name for the area that stretches north to Glade.

References

Settlements in British Columbia